Diamond Walkers is a 1965 South African-German adventure film directed by Paul Martin and starring Harald Leipnitz, Joachim Hansen and Marisa Mell. The film portrays diamond smuggling in South Africa. Its German title is Jagd auf blaue Diamanten.

Cast
 Harald Leipnitz – Mike Johnson
 Joachim Hansen – Peter Wade
 Marisa Mell – Irene de Ridder
 Ann Smyrner – Karen Truter
 Brian O'Shaughnessy – Sergeant Barrett
 Gert Van den Bergh – Piet Truter
 Ivan Berold – Webber
 Bill Brewer – De Ridder
 Mervyn John – Bill Jenkins
 James White – Harris
 Patrick Mynhardt – Kelly
 Simon Sabela – Lobata (Ngela)
 John Marcus – Butu
 Barney Sidwaba - Gang Leader
 Morgan Langa – 1st African Policeman
 Jose Sithole – 2nd African Policeman

References

External links

1965 films
1960s adventure drama films
German adventure drama films
West German films
English-language German films
English-language South African films
1960s German-language films
Films directed by Paul Martin
Films set in South Africa
South African adventure drama films
1965 drama films
1960s German films